Makhalaneng is a community council located in the Maseru District of Lesotho. The population in 2006 was 13,146.

Villages
The community of Makhalaneng includes the villages of Aupolasi, Bochabela, Borata, Ha Abele, Ha Chake, Ha Chere (Koung), Ha Dinizulu, Ha Fane, Ha Fokoane, Ha Joele, Ha Kali, Ha Kelebone, Ha Kori, Ha Kou (Maliphokoana), Ha Lefeko, Ha Leholi, Ha Lejaha, Ha Lekota, Ha Lekunutu, Ha Lesooana, Ha Letsema, Ha Lithathane, Ha Makhema, Ha Makoae, Ha Maloma, Ha Mammenyana, Ha Maphephe, Ha Maphoma, Ha Masakale, Ha Maseru (Aupolasi), Ha Matšaba, Ha Matšoana, Ha Metsing, Ha Mohale-a-Phala, Ha Moitšupeli, Ha Mojakane, Ha Mojakopo, Ha Mokheseng, Ha Mokhou, Ha Mokola, Ha Molahloe, Ha Moora, Ha Moshe, Ha Motale, Ha Mothibeli, Ha Motjotji, Ha Motlelepe, Ha Motsoafa, Ha Nako, Ha Nkabane, Ha Ntima, Ha Pelei, Ha Phathang, Ha Pholo, Ha Potiane, Ha Raboletsi, Ha Rakhati, Ha Raleqheka, Ha Ramosoeu, Ha Raqoane, Ha Sematle, Ha Seoloana, Ha Serabele, Ha Shoaepane, Ha Talasi, Ha Tlali, Ha Tlapana, Ha Toki (Moqoakong), Ha Tšehla, Ha Tsuu, Kena (Ha Matheatlala), Kena (Ha Mothibeli), Kena (Ha Tsola), Koqong, Koung, Likhoaleng, Liphakoeng, Lithabaneng, Maama, Maholong, Mantša-tlala, Matsoapong, Motlejoa, Motse-Mocha (Ha Lekunutu), Rabolinyane, Sekukurung, Terae, Thaba-Chitja and Tholang.

References

External links
 Google map of community villages

Populated places in Maseru District